The 1967 Tour de France was the 54th edition of the Tour de France, one of cycling's Grand Tours. The Tour began in Angers with an individual time trial on 29 June, and Stage 11 occurred on 11 July with a mountainous stage to Digne. The race finished in Paris on 23 July.

Stage 1a
29 June 1967 – Angers to Angers,  (ITT)

Stage 1b
30 June 1967 – Angers to Saint-Malo,

Stage 2
1 July 1967 – Saint-Malo to Caen,

Stage 3
2 July 1967 – Caen to Amiens,

Stage 4
3 July 1967 – Amiens to Roubaix,

Stage 5a
4 July 1967 – Roubaix to Jambes,

Stage 5b
4 July 1967 – Jambes to Jambes,  (TTT)

Stage 6
5 July 1967 – Jambes to Metz,

Stage 7
6 July 1967 – Metz to Strasbourg,

Stage 8
6 July 1967 – Strasbourg to Belfort/Ballon d'Alsace,

Rest day 1
8 July 1967 – Belfort

Stage 9
9 July 1967 – Belfort to Divonne-les-Bains,

Stage 10
10 July 1967 – Divonne les Bains to Briançon,

Stage 11
11 July 1967 – Briançon to Digne,

References

1967 Tour de France
Tour de France stages